Thomas County (standard abbreviation: TH) is a county located in the U.S. state of Kansas. As of the 2020 census, the county population was 7,930. Its county seat is Colby.

History

Early history

For many millennia, the Great Plains of North America was inhabited by nomadic Native Americans.  From the 16th century to 18th century, the Kingdom of France claimed ownership of large parts of North America.  In 1762, after the French and Indian War, France secretly ceded New France to Spain, per the Treaty of Fontainebleau.

19th century
In 1802, Spain returned most of the land to France, but keeping title to about 7,500 square miles.  In 1803, most of the land for modern day Kansas was acquired by the United States from France as part of the 828,000 square mile Louisiana Purchase for 2.83 cents per acre.

In 1854, the Kansas Territory was organized, then in 1861 Kansas became the 34th U.S. state.  Thomas County was founded on October 8, 1885.  It was named for George Henry Thomas, a Union general during the American Civil War, hero of the Battle of Chickamauga.  The townships of the county were named after the soldiers that died at the Battle of Chickamauga.

Geography

Major highways
 Interstate 70
 U.S. Highway 24
 U.S. Highway 83
 Kansas Highway 25

Adjacent counties
 Rawlins County (north)
 Decatur County (northeast)
 Sheridan County (east)
 Gove County (southeast)
 Logan County (south)
 Sherman County (west/Mountain Time border)

Demographics

As of the census of 2000, there were 8,180 people, 3,226 households, and 2,125 families residing in the county.  The population density was 8 people per square mile (3/km2).  There were 3,562 housing units at an average density of 3 per square mile (1/km2).  The racial makeup of the county was 97.14% White, 0.43% Black or African American, 0.33% Native American, 0.27% Asian, 0.02% Pacific Islander, 0.95% from other races, and 0.86% from two or more races.  1.85% of the population were Hispanic or Latino of any race.

There were 3,226 households, out of which 32.90% had children under the age of 18 living with them, 56.10% were married couples living together, 6.90% had a female householder with no husband present, and 34.10% were non-families. 28.40% of all households were made up of individuals, and 11.70% had someone living alone who was 65 years of age or older.  The average household size was 2.45 and the average family size was 3.04.

In the county, the population was spread out, with 26.30% under the age of 18, 13.50% from 18 to 24, 24.40% from 25 to 44, 21.20% from 45 to 64, and 14.60% who were 65 years of age or older.  The median age was 35 years. For every 100 females there were 94.60 males.  For every 100 females age 18 and over, there were 91.50 males.

The median income for a household in the county was $37,034, and the median income for a family was $45,931. Males had a median income of $33,833 versus $21,310 for females. The per capita income for the county was $19,028.  About 6.60% of families and 9.70% of the population were below the poverty line, including 5.90% of those under age 18 and 7.50% of those age 65 or over.

Government

Presidential elections
Thomas County is strongly Republican, and has increasingly been this way over the past few election cycles. The last time a Democratic candidate has carried Thomas County was in 1964 by Lyndon B. Johnson.

Laws
Thomas County was a prohibition, or "dry", county until the Kansas Constitution was amended in 1986 and voters approved the sale of alcoholic liquor by the individual drink with a 30 percent food sales requirement.

Education

Colleges
 Colby Community College

Unified school districts
 Brewster USD 314
 Colby USD 315
 Golden Plains USD 316

Communities

Cities
 Brewster
 Colby
 Gem
 Menlo
 Oakley (part)
 Rexford

Unincorporated communities
† means a Census-Designated Place (CDP) by the United States Census Bureau.
 Halford
 Levant†
 Mingo

Ghost towns
 Copeland
 Cumberland
 Kuka
 Otterbourne
 Quickville

Townships
Thomas County is divided into thirteen townships.  The townships were named in honor of men who were killed at the Battle of Chickamauga. The city of Colby is considered governmentally independent and is excluded from the census figures for the townships. Geographically, Colby is surrounded by Morgan Township. In the following table, the population center is the largest city (or cities) included in that township's population total, if it is of a significant size.

See also

References

Further reading

 Standard Atlas of Thomas County, Kansas; Geo. A. Ogle & Co; 64 pages; 1907.

External links

County
 
 Thomas County - Directory of Public Officials
Maps
 Thomas County Maps: Current, Historic, KDOT
 Kansas Highway Maps: Current, Historic, KDOT
 Kansas Railroad Maps: Current, 1996, 1915, KDOT and Kansas Historical Society

 
Kansas counties
1885 establishments in Kansas
Populated places established in 1885